The PT Mi-Ba (also known as the PT Mi-Ba-53) is a circular Bakelite cased Czechoslovakian minimum metal anti-tank blast mine. The mine entered service with the Czech and Slovakian armies in the 1950s and is now obsolete and no longer in service. The mine is conventional in layout with a central pressure plate, and doughnut-shaped main charge around a booster charge and RO-7-II fuze.  The mine's fuze is the only component that contains any metal, and this is limited to a spring, the striker pin, and the detonator capsule.

Specifications
 Diameter: 324 mm
 Height: 115 mm
 Weight: 7.83 kg
 Explosive content: 6 kg of TNT with a 0.208 kg booster charge
 Operating pressure: 200 to 400 kg

References
 Jane's Mines and Mine Clearance 2005-2006
 

Anti-tank mines
Land mines of Czechoslovakia